Luis Hernández (born 2 June 1973) is an Ecuadorian boxer. He competed in the men's welterweight event at the 1996 Summer Olympics.

References

1973 births
Living people
Ecuadorian male boxers
Olympic boxers of Ecuador
Boxers at the 1996 Summer Olympics
Place of birth missing (living people)
Welterweight boxers